The daidai (Japanese: 橙, 臭橙; Chinese: 酸橙; Korean: 광귤, gwanggyul), is an Asian variety of bitter orange.

The daidai originated in the Himalayas. It spread to the Yangtze valley region and later to Japan. The colour of the fruit loses yellowish hue and becomes greener in the spring.
The native Japanese word for the color orange,  or daidai-iro, is derived from the name of this fruit.

Uses
The fruit is very bitter, and not usually eaten, but its dried peel is used in Kampo (the Japanese adaptation of Chinese medicine). The dry peels of young fruits are called kijitsu (枳実), and used as a stomachic and expectorant as well as a laxative. Peel of ripe daidai is called , and is used as a fragrant stomachic and expectorant.

Cultural aspect 
That is why people also called it ).

Daidai is used as a decoration in Japanese New Year celebrations, such as Shimekazari, as a symbol of the family to continue for generations, and people place a fruit on top of kagami mochi, a stack of two to three round and flat mochi. This use is believed to date from the Edo period.

It has not yet been resolved as a true species by The Plant List.

References

Fruits originating in Asia
Japanese fruit
Citrus